Pierre Breytenbach is a South African actor and comic. He is also a voice artist.

High school
Hoërskool Die Wilgers in Pretoria, Gauteng.

Training
He obtained a B.A. in Drama in 1998 from the University of Pretoria.

TV appearances
He starred in numerous South African soaps including Egoli, Generations and 7de Laan. He is also part of the permanent cast of Proesstraat

References 

Living people
South African male soap opera actors
University of Pretoria alumni
Year of birth missing (living people)